Raini-Alena Rodriguez (born July 1, 1993) is an American actress and singer. She is known for her roles as Trish in the Disney Channel original series Austin & Ally, Maya Blart in Paul Blart: Mall Cop (2009) and Paul Blart: Mall Cop 2 (2015), and Tess in Prom (2011). She won Best Young Television Actress at the 2013 Imagen Awards.

Early life
Rodriguez was born in Bryan, Texas. She is the older sister of actor Rico Rodriguez. She has two other brothers, Ray and Roy Jr. Her parents, Diane and Roy Rodriguez, own a business called Rodriguez Tire Service. She is of Mexican descent.

Raini was discovered at an IMTA showcase, by Susan Osser, a California talent agent. After viewing Raini's performance, Osser suggested to Raini's mother that Osser should become Raini's manager and come to California to give Raini a year for career opportunities. At the time, Raini was 11 years old. Her mother agreed. Raini and her brother Rico moved to Los Angeles with their mother, while their father stayed in Texas to run the tire shop. Their mother home-schooled them to support their careers.

On March 12, 2017, Rodriguez's father, Roy, died at age 52.

Filmography

Film

Television

Discography

Singles

As lead artist

As featured artist

Promotional singles

Videography

Awards and nominations

References

External links

1993 births
Living people
21st-century American actresses
Actresses from Texas
American actresses of Mexican descent
American child actresses
American film actresses
American television actresses
American voice actresses
People from Bryan, Texas
21st-century American women singers
21st-century American singers